Interleukin 13 receptor, alpha 1, also known as IL13RA1 and CD213A1 (cluster of differentiation 213A1), is a human gene.

The protein encoded by this gene is a subunit of the interleukin 13 receptor. This subunit forms a receptor complex with IL4 receptor alpha, a subunit shared by IL13 and IL4 receptors. This subunit serves as a primary IL13-binding subunit of the IL13 receptor, and may also be a component of IL4 receptors. This protein has been shown to bind tyrosine kinase TYK2, and thus may mediate the signaling processes that lead to the activation of JAK1, STAT3 and STAT6 induced by IL13 and IL4.

See also
 Interleukin-13 receptor

References

Further reading

External links
 

Clusters of differentiation